Sau Shashi Deodhar is an Indian Marathi language film directed by Amol Shetge and produced by Shilpa Shirodkar Ranjit and Kushna Shetty. The film stars Sai Tamhankar, Ajinkya Deo and Tushar Dalvi. The film was released on 21 February 2014.

Synopsis 
Shubhada loses her identity after a car accident and informs the police that she is Shashi Deodhar's wife. However, a man named Thakur approaches the police claiming Shubhada to be his wife.

Cast 
 Sai Tamhankar as Shubhada
 Ajinkya Deo as Dr Ajinkya Vartak
 Tushar Dalvi as Shashi Deodhar
 Shilpa Gandhi
 Avinash Kharshikar
 Aniket Kelkar
 Anushka Ranjit

Soundtrack

Critical response 
Sau Shashi Deodhar received positive reviews from critics. Soumitra Pote of Maharashtra Times rated the film 3 out of 5 stars and wrote "The planned journey has been completed perfectly by the director with the help of everyone. So he entertains well". The Times of India also gave it 3.5 stars out of 5 and similarly found that "Thrilling, well-crafted and disturbing at the same time, is 'Sau Shashi Deodhar' for you. It is perhaps the only film after 'Pune 52' in this genre that succeeds in playing mind games with the viewers and is a good watch for psychological thriller buffs". Divyamarathi wrote " It presents the gruesome reality of oppression of women for the lamp of the race. A different topic has been presented before the society by taking care of the human mind". Loksatta wrote "Complicated and forced to think about what would happen next, 'Mrs. Shashi Deodhar is a one time must watch movie".

References

External links
 
 

2014 films
2010s Marathi-language films
Indian drama films
Indian romance films